

Incumbents 
 President: Nursultan Nazarbayev

Events 
30 January – Kazakhstan is admitted to the Conference on Security and Co-operation in Europe.
2 March – Kazakhstan becomes a member of the United Nations.
8 August – The first edition of the Kazakhstan Cup concludes when Kairat defeats Fosfor at the final.

References 

 
Years of the 20th century in Kazakhstan
Kazakhstan
Kazakhstan
Kazakhstan
1990s in Kazakhstan